Statistics of Bulgarian State Football Championship in the 1934 season.

Overview
It was contested by 14 teams, and Vladislav Varna won the championship.

First round

|}

Quarter-finals

|}

Semi-finals

Final

References
Bulgaria - List of final tables (RSSSF)

Bulgarian State Football Championship seasons
1
1
Bul
Bul